Edward Anderson may refer to:

Military
Edward Clifford Anderson (1815–1883), American Civil War naval officer
Edward Anderson (American general, born 1864) (1864–1937), American general from World War I 
Edward D. Anderson (1868–1940), American general from World War I
Edward W. Anderson (1903–1979), American Air Force general from World War II
Edward L. Anderson, United States Navy officer

Politicians
Edward Anderson (19th-century Texas politician) (1820–1896), state legislator in Texas affiliated with the Republican Party
Edward Anderson (20th-century Texas politician) (1859–1923), state legislator in Texas affiliated with the Democratic Party

Sports
Eddie Anderson (American football coach) (1900–1974), Hall of Fame college football coach
Eddie Anderson (footballer) (born 1949), association football player with Clyde FC
Eddie Anderson (safety) (born 1963), former American NFL safety
Edward Anderson (sport shooter) (1908–?), Belizean Olympic shooter
Edward Anderson (cyclist) (born 1998), American professional cyclist
Ted Anderson (1911–1979), English footballer

Others
Eddie "Rochester" Anderson (1905–1977), American comic actor who played the character Rochester on the Jack Benny program
Ed Anderson (chemist), organic chemist
Edward H. Anderson (1858–1928), Swedish Mormon missionary
Edward O. Anderson (1891–1977), American architect
Edward Frederick Anderson (1932–2001), American botanist
Ed O.G. (born 1970), American hip-hop musician, born Edward Anderson
J. Edward Anderson (born 1927), American engineer and proponent of personal rapid transit

See also 
Edmund Anderson (disambiguation)
Edwin Anderson (disambiguation)